Trinorfolkia incisa, known commonly as the notched triplefin or notched threefin, is a species of triplefin blenny in the genus Trinorfolkia. It was described by Rudie Kuiter in 1986. This species occurs along the southern coast of Australia from the south western coast of Western Australia to Victoria and around Tasmania.

References

Notched triplefin
Fish described in 1986